"Accidents Happen" is the fourth single to be taken from Australian singer Zoë Badwi's debut album Zoë.

Track listing
Digital single
 Accidents Happen - 3:08
 Freefallin (Acoustic) - 2:43

Remix EP
 Accidents Happen (Liam Keegan Remix) - 6:00
 Accidents Happen (I Am Sam Remix) - 7:10
 Accidents Happen (Walden Remix - 6:02
 Accidents Happen (Fabian Gray & Emanuele Remix) - 7:00

Music video
During filming for the video, Badwi and the crew were "fired upon by catapult" by someone who lived in the street where it was filmed

Charts

References

2011 singles
Zoë Badwi songs
2011 songs